The World Athletics Combined Events Tour (formerly IAAF Combined Events Challenge and World Athletics Challenge – Combined Events) is an annual series of combined track and field events meetings, organised since 1998 by World Athletics, with heptathlon for women and decathlon for men. The winners are decided by totalling the number of points that the athletes have scored in each of three combined events competitions during the season. Points scored are determined by the World Athletics combined events scoring tables. The series includes annual independent combined events meetings as well as championship level combined events competitions, such as the World Athletics Championships and Olympic Games. It is the premier seasonal competition for decathletes and heptathletes, as combined events are not held for the Diamond League.

The total prize money available is US$202,000, split evenly between male and female athletes. The male and female winners each receive $30,000, while second and third placed athletes are entitled to $20,000 and $15,000 respectively. Smaller prizes are given to the rest of the top eight finishers.

All events of the 2020 season were cancelled due to the COVID-19 pandemic.

Editions

Meetings

Gold level
From 2022 season the Tour is divided into three levels – Gold, Silver and Bronze.

*Prior to 2013, the Multistars meet was held in Desenzano del Garda

International competitions
Summer Olympic Games
World Athletics Championships
Commonwealth Games
Jeux de la Francophonie
Mediterranean Games
Universiade
African Combined Events Championships
Asian Athletics Championships
Asian Games
European Athletics Championships
European Combined Events Team Championships
Pan American Combined Events Cup
Oceania Combined Events Championships
USA Outdoor Track and Field Championships

Results

Men

Women

See also
World Athletics Race Walking Tour
IAAF World Cross Challenge

References

External links
Home page
Results at gbrathletics.com
IAAF combined events scoring tables

 
Annual athletics series
Combined events competitions
Decathlon
Heptathlon
Recurring sporting events established in 1998
Combined Events Challenge